Poltimore is a village and civil parish in Devon, England.

Poltimore may also refer to:

 , Canada, in Val-des-Monts
 Baron Poltimore, a title in the Peerage of the United Kingdom for Poltimore, Devon
 John Poltimore (fl. 1390), English politician